Oswaldo José Guillén Barrios (born January 20, 1964) is a former professional baseball player and manager. He played in Major League Baseball as a shortstop for 16 seasons, primarily with the Chicago White Sox, from 1985 to 2000. During that time, he won the American Rookie of the Year Award and also a Gold Glove.  He was considered one of the best defensive shortstops of his era. Guillen later managed the Chicago White Sox from 2004 to 2011, winning the World Series in 2005 and then moving to the Miami Marlins in 2012.

As a player, Guillén was respected for his passion, speed, hustle, intensity and defensive abilities and his ebullient love for the game. In 2005, Guillen became the first Latino manager in major league history to win a World Series when he captained the Chicago White Sox to their first championship in 88 years.

Playing career

Guillén was a light-hitting, quick-handed shortstop, emerging from a line of Venezuelan shortstops that included Chico Carrasquel, Luis Aparicio (both White Sox players), Dave Concepción, and Omar Vizquel (who played for Guillen as a utility player for the White Sox). He was originally signed as a free agent by the San Diego Padres in 1980. In December 1984, he was traded to the Chicago White Sox as part of an eight-player trade, with Tim Lollar, Bill Long and Luis Salazar in exchange for LaMarr Hoyt.

In 1985, Guillén was both the American League Rookie of the Year and The Sporting News Rookie of the Year, while also becoming just the third rookie shortstop in major league history to win a fielding title. He became known for his daring, aggressive style of play, as was demonstrated on August 2, 1985, in a game against the New York Yankees. With the game tied 5–5 in the 11th inning, Guillén  hit a two-out single and, then proceeded to steal second base. When the next batter hit an infield single, Guillén never hesitated as he rounded third base, catching the Yankees defense off guard and scored the game-winning run.

In 1989, Guillén was the victim of a hidden ball trick twice. First on June 23 when Greg Brock tagged him out when Guillén, the runner at first base, took his lead, and then had to dive back to the base on a pick off throw from the pitcher.  Brock held the ball instead of throwing it back to the pitcher, and when Guillén took his hand off the base to stand up, Brock tagged him out. On August 5, Dave Bergman made the same play, holding onto the ball following a pick off throw.  Guillén again dove to the base to beat the throw, and when he took his hand off the base to stand up, Bergman tagged him on top of the batting helmet without looking at him.

On April 21, 1992, Guillén suffered a severe knee injury in a collision with outfielder Tim Raines. The injury caused him to miss almost the entire season, and subsequently diminished his defensive range as well as his stolen base output for the remainder of his career. Guillén recovered in 1993 with his most productive season offensively, posting a .280 batting average, and he hit a career-high four home runs and had 50 runs batted in (RBI) in 134 games. The White Sox went on to win the American League Western Division title. He hit .273 and scored four runs in the 1993 American League Championship Series as the White Sox were defeated by the Toronto Blue Jays in six games.

In October 1997, after 13 seasons with the White Sox, Guillén was granted free agency status and signed a contract to play for the Baltimore Orioles. In May 1998, the Orioles released him and he signed with the Atlanta Braves as a utility infielder. He helped the Braves win the 1999 National League Championship Series against the New York Mets with a 10th inning, pinch hit single in Game 6 of the series that tied the score at nine runs apiece, as the Braves went on to win the game and the series. The Braves would eventually lose to the New York Yankees in Guillén's only World Series appearance as a player. After playing one year with the Tampa Bay Devil Rays in 2000, he retired as a player at the end of the season at the age of 36.

Career statistics
In a sixteen-year major league career, Guillén played in 1,993 games, accumulating 1,764 hits in 6,686 at bats for a .264 career batting average along with 28 home runs, 619 runs batted in, and an on-base percentage of .287. Guillén was an All-Star in 1988, 1990–1991, and won the Gold Glove Award in 1990. He led American League shortstops twice in range factor, once in assists and once in fielding percentage. Guillén's .974 career fielding percentage ranks him 40th overall among major league shortstops, ahead of, among others, of both Luis Aparicio and Dave Concepción. While he was considered one of the best fielding shortstops in the American League, Guillén was often overlooked in post-season fielding awards because his playing career coincided with that of Tony Fernandez, Cal Ripken Jr., and later Omar Vizquel. This trio would win every American League Gold Glove for a shortstop from 1986 until 2001, with the one exception being Guillén's 1990 season award. Guillén ranks among the White Sox all-time leaders in games played (sixth), hits (seventh), at-bats (sixth), plate appearances (seventh), total bases (10th) and triples (10th). As a hitter, he was known as a free swinger, posting one of the highest at bats per walk ratios in major league history and also had one of the lowest on base percentages for many of the years he played. Guillén played his entire Venezuelan Winter League career with Tiburones de La Guaira.

Managerial career

Chicago White Sox
Following his playing career, Guillén coached for the Montreal Expos in 2001 and 2002 and the World champion Florida Marlins (now known as the Miami Marlins). In 2003, he was hired in the offseason to replace Jerry Manuel as the White Sox manager. He received a standing ovation from the crowd of 37,706 Chicagoans when introduced before his first game as a manager at U.S. Cellular Field on April 13, 2004. On May 30, 2005, the White Sox extended Guillén's contract, making the move while the team had the best record in the majors (33–17).

In 2005, he led the White Sox to their first American League pennant since 1959, and their first World Series win since 1917 with a four-game sweep of the Houston Astros. Guillén claimed that he might retire after the 2005 season should the White Sox win the World Series, but at the parade celebrating the World Champions he received cheers from the fans when he announced he would indeed return to manage the next season. The White Sox picked up the 2006 option on his contract, added two more years and included an option for the 2009 season.  In November, Guillén was voted the 2005 American League Manager of the Year Award by the Baseball Writers' Association of America. On September 11, 2007, Guillén signed another contract extension with the White Sox through the 2012 season.

On September 4, 2009, Guillén won his 500th game as manager of the Chicago White Sox as the White Sox defeated the Boston Red Sox by a score of 12–2. Guillen has publicly stated that he feels the 2003 steroids list should be released to the public.

Personal difficulties with White Sox General Manager Kenny Williams led to speculation dating back to October 2010 that the White Sox would allow Guillén out of his contract to manage the Marlins. On September 26, 2011, an inability to get a contract extension worked out with the White Sox eventually led to his being released from his position, with the White Sox retaining the right to receive compensation should Guillén manage in the 2012 season. He finished with a record of 678 wins and 617 losses.

Miami Marlins

On September 28, 2011, the Miami Marlins introduced Guillén as their new manager. Robin Ventura replaced Guillén as manager of the White Sox. The Marlins sent Jhan Mariñez and Osvaldo Martínez to the Chicago White Sox as compensation for the hiring of Guillén by the Marlins, as Guillen had one year remaining on his contract with the White Sox.

The Marlins were expected to contend in their first year in their new park.  However, an 8–18 June effectively ended their season, and they finished 69–93, their worst season since the start of the century.  On October 23, 2012, Guillen was terminated from the Marlins, despite three years remaining on his contract, after making some inflammatory comments about Fidel Castro.

In February 2016, Guillen was hired to manage the Tiburones de La Guaira of the Venezuelan Professional Baseball League for the 2016–17 season.

Others teams
Guillen was hired to manage the Tiburones de La Guaira of the Venezuelan Professional Baseball League for the 2016–17 season, but has not found his way back to a major league dugout. In 2022 has been named the bench coach for Team France in this year’s World Baseball Classic, joining the staff of manager Bruce Bochy. The French team will compete in a qualifier in Regensburg, Germany in September.

Managerial record

Broadcasting career
Guillén joined ESPN Deportes in 2013, where he has worked as baseball color analyst and talk show panelist. He is currently a studio analyst for NBC Sports Chicago before and after White Sox games.

Personal life

Guillén married Ibis Cardenas in 1983. They have three sons: Ozwaldo "Ozzie" Jr. (born 1985), Oney (born 1986), and Ozney (born 1992). Ozzie Jr. was born in Las Vegas, Nevada; his two younger brothers were born in Venezuela. When Ozzie Guillen turned 42 in January 2006, he, his wife, and son Oney became naturalized U.S. citizens. Ozzie Jr. is the lead Spanish-language broadcaster on the White Sox radio network.

He is also the brother-in-law of former White Sox teammate Scott Radinsky.

Controversies
Guillen is known for being somewhat eccentric and outspoken, which sometimes lands him in the middle of controversy.  He declined to join in the traditional visit to the White House after the 2005 White Sox World Series win.

In June 2006 he was quoted as calling Chicago Sun-Times columnist Jay Mariotti a fag. He later apologized for offending any LGBTQ people, but did not back down in his criticism of Mariotti.

In 2010, he spoke against Arizona's new law to deal with illegal immigration. Guillen described illegal immigrants as "workaholics." "And this country can't survive without them," he said. "There are a lot of people from this country who are lazy. We're not. Prove me wrong. A lot of people in this country want to be on the computer and send e-mails to people. We do the hard work. We're the ones who go out and work in the sun to make this country better." In August, Guillen said that Asian players were treated better than Latino players, stating that while it is common practice for major league clubs to provide a Japanese or Korean translator for their Asian born players, no such translator is provided for their Spanish-speaking Latin American ballplayers.

On April 10, 2012, Guillén was suspended for five games by the Marlins due to comments made about former Cuban president Fidel Castro. In a Time interview Guillen said, "I love Fidel Castro ... I respect Fidel Castro. You know why? A lot of people have wanted to kill Fidel Castro for the last [53] years, but that mofo is still here." The fallout from those comments was a major factor in his ouster after the season; according to Marlins baseball operations chief Larry Beinfest, the Marlins' attendance flatlined after those remarks and never recovered, although the Marlins actually reached over two million fans in attendance that season (the third and so far last time that has happened for the Marlins).

See also

 List of Major League Baseball players from Venezuela

References

External links

1964 births
Living people
American sportspeople of Venezuelan descent
American League All-Stars
American Santeríans
Atlanta Braves players
Baltimore Orioles players
Beaumont Golden Gators players
Chicago White Sox managers
Chicago White Sox players
Florida Marlins coaches
Gold Glove Award winners
Gulf Coast Padres players
Las Vegas Stars (baseball) players
Major League Baseball players from Venezuela
Venezuelan expatriate baseball players in the United States
Major League Baseball Rookie of the Year Award winners
Major League Baseball third base coaches
Major League Baseball shortstops
Manager of the Year Award winners
Miami Marlins managers
Montreal Expos coaches
Naturalized citizens of the United States
Obscenity controversies
People from Ocumare del Tuy
Reno Padres players
Tampa Bay Devil Rays players
Tiburones de La Guaira players
Venezuelan baseball coaches
Venezuelan emigrants to the United States
Venezuelan Santeríans
World Series-winning managers
Bridgeport Bluefish guest managers